Hilltop Lake is a lagoon in Richmond, California.

Overview
The lake is fed by Garrity Creek, a small river originating from many springs in the hills east of the Hilltop Green neighborhood in the Hilltop neighborhood. The pond is located within Hilltop Lake Park and is very close to Hilltop Mall. The lake is in the middle of the flow of the creek and the water flows to the marshlands and shoreline of San Pablo Bay. The water body is sometimes confused with Temporary Pond; however, this lagoon lies to the northwest and is fed by a different watershed entirely.

See also
List of lakes in California
List of lakes in the San Francisco Bay Area

References

External links

Lakes of Contra Costa County, California
Bodies of water of Richmond, California
Lakes of California
Lakes of Northern California